Friedrich-Wilhelm Ulrich (born 20 October 1953) is a German rower who competed for East Germany in the 1976 Summer Olympics and in the 1980 Summer Olympics.

He was born in Packebusch. In 1976 he was a crew member of the East German boat which won the gold medal in the coxed pairs event. Four years later he won his second gold medal with the East German boat in the coxed pairs competition.

References

1953 births
Living people
People from Altmarkkreis Salzwedel
People from Bezirk Magdeburg
East German male rowers
Sportspeople from Saxony-Anhalt
Olympic rowers of East Germany
Rowers at the 1976 Summer Olympics
Rowers at the 1980 Summer Olympics
Olympic gold medalists for East Germany
Olympic medalists in rowing
Medalists at the 1980 Summer Olympics
Medalists at the 1976 Summer Olympics
World Rowing Championships medalists for East Germany
Recipients of the Patriotic Order of Merit in silver
European Rowing Championships medalists